Hewitt's moss frog (Anhydrophryne hewitti), also known as Natal chirping frog or yellow bandit frog, is a species of frog in the  Pyxicephalidae family. It is found in the Drakensberg mountains of South Africa, possibly including adjacent Lesotho.

Anhydrophryne hewitti populations are small and fragmented, found in pockets of forest and dense vegetation. Breeding takes place in wet mossy areas near waterfalls and rapids. Eggs are laid in moss and leaf-litter. The eggs develop directly without a free-living tadpole stage.

References

Anhydrophryne
Amphibians of South Africa
Amphibians described in 1947
Taxa named by Vivian Frederick Maynard FitzSimons
Taxonomy articles created by Polbot